Nermedin Selimov (born 3 January 1954) is a Bulgarian former wrestler who competed at the 1976 Summer Olympics and the 1980 Summer Olympics.

References

1954 births
Living people
Olympic wrestlers of Bulgaria
Wrestlers at the 1976 Summer Olympics
Wrestlers at the 1980 Summer Olympics
Bulgarian male sport wrestlers
Olympic bronze medalists for Bulgaria
Olympic medalists in wrestling
Bulgarian people of Turkish descent
People from Razgrad Province
Medalists at the 1980 Summer Olympics